Hardiman is an Irish or English surname. It is either an Anglicized form of the Gaelic Ó hArgadáin, meaning 'descendant of Argadán', or a nickname for a brave man, from the Middle English hardi (hardy) + man (man). Notable people with the surname include:

 Adrian Hardiman (1951–2016), justice of the Irish Supreme Court
 Alfred Frank Hardiman (1891–1949), English sculptor
 Derek Hardiman (born 1981), Irish hurler
 James Hardiman (1782–1855), Irish librarian and author
 Rachel Hardiman (born 1961), Irish cricketer
 Ronan Hardiman (born 1961), Irish composer
 Terrence Hardiman (born 1937), English actor
 Thomas Hardiman (born 1965), American judge
 Paul Hardiman (born 1955) British Music Producer 
 Tom Hardiman (born 1985) British Film director and screen writer 
Olivia Nichola Hardiman (born 2002) Author

See also
 Hardiman, GE engineering project
 Hardman (disambiguation)

References

Anglicised Irish-language surnames
English-language surnames